Dr. T. Jayalakshmi, known by her pen name as Dr. Jayalakshmi Seethapura, is one of the eminent folklorists of modern India who writes in Kannada language. She is a retired Folklore professor of Mysore University. Jayalakshmi has performed hundreds of state and national level cultural competitions as judge. Her books on folklore have well received by the readers of Karnataka. 

Jayalakshmi has written more than 30 books on folklore and few are "Namma suttina Janapada Kathana Geethegalu"(published by 'Karnataka Janapada and Yakshagana academy'), "Hakki haaryave gidadaga", "Jaanapada hatti", "Kalyanavenni Janarella"(published by Kannada Sahitya Parishat) and many more. She has written numerous articles on folklore and folk literature of Karnataka.
Dr. Seethapura received the Karnataka Janapada academy award in 2016.

Books

Dr. Jayalakshmi has written more than 30 books, mostly related to Folklore and Cultural studies. Some of these are:
 Hakki haaryave gidadaga
 Kalyanavenni janarella
 Jaanapada Hatti
 Namma Suttina Janapada Kathanageethegalu

Awards
 2017 - Presided the chair at ‛6th Pandavapura Taluk Kannada Sahitya Sammelana’
 2016 - ‛Dr. Jeeshampa Award’ by Karnataka Janapada Academy.

References 

Living people
Indian folklorists
1954 births
Kannada-language writers
People from Mandya district
People from Karnataka
Kannada people
Women writers from Karnataka